Jianwen (6 February 1399 – 29 July 1402) was the era name of the Jianwen Emperor, the second emperor of the Ming dynasty of China, and was used for a total of four years. The Yongle Emperor did not recognise the Jianwen era name after the success of the Jingnan campaign and changed "Jianwen 4" (建文四年, "the fourth year of the Jianwen era") to "Hongwu 35" (洪武三十五年, "the thirty-fifth year of the Hongwu era"). The Wanli Emperor issued an edict in 1595 (Wanli 23) to restore the Jianwen era name.

It is worth noting that the Yongle Emperor never announced the abolition of the Jianwen era name. Some scholars believe that the abolition of the era name was not Yongle's original intention but only the actions of his subordinates. Some people also believe that the Yongle Emperor recklessly tampered with the history of the Jianwen era by re-editing Taizu Shilu (太祖實錄) and Fengtian Jingnan Ji (奉天靖難記), which is actually equivalent to abolishing the Jianwen era name, but he is unwilling to personally implement it publicly and bear historical responsibility.

Comparison table
The Gānzhī of each month on the right side of the table was the first day of each month. "(Long)" means that the month has 30 days, and "(Short)" means that the month has 29 days. The numbers in the "leap month" table indicate the X leap month of that year, and the numbers below the first day of each month indicate the corresponding Western calendar date.

Other regime era names that existed during the same period
 Vietnam
 Kiến Tân (建新, 1398–1400): Trần dynasty — era name of Trần Thiếu Đế
 Thánh Nguyên (聖元, 1400): Hồ dynasty — era name of Hồ Quý Ly
 Thiệu Thành (紹成, 1401–1403): Hồ dynasty — era name of Hồ Hán Thương
 Japan
 Ōei (応永, 1394–1428): Japan — era name of Emperor Go-Komatsu and Emperor Shōkō

See also
 List of Chinese era names
 List of Ming dynasty era names

References

Extended reading

Ming dynasty eras